The Chremonidean War (267–261 BC) was fought by a coalition of some Greek city-states and Ptolemaic Egypt against Antigonid Macedonian domination.  It ended in a Macedonian victory which confirmed Antigonid control over the city-states of Greece.

Athens and Sparta sought a restoration of their former independence while Ptolemy Philadelphus's ambitions in the Aegean were threatened by Antigonus Gonatas's fleet, so he built an anti-Macedonian coalition among the Greek city-states. He  courted Athens by supplying the city with grain.

The anti-Macedonian faction in Athens, led by the Stoic statesman and general Chremonides, took power and declared war on Macedon (possibly as early as the autumn of 268 BC). The first year of the conflict saw only minor confrontations which generally ended favourably for the anti-Macedonian coalition. After the indecisive campaign season of 266 BC, in which Athens was assisted by a Ptolemaic fleet under Patroclus, the war began to turn against the Greek city-states, and in 265 BC Antigonus won a decisive and crushing victory outside Corinth during which the Spartan King Areus I was killed.

With their primary ally defeated and too militarily weak to confront the Antigonids alone, the Athenians waited behind their walls, hoping the Ptolemies could send aid before the inevitable siege. Philadelphus would not be ready to mount a major expedition until after Athens had already been starved into surrender in either 262 BC or 261 BC. In the end it did not matter since when the Ptolemies finally tried to send aid and reinforcements to Athens, their fleet was defeated off Cos (probably in 261 BC).  This action, called the Battle of Cos, also features in the narrative of the second of the Syrian Wars with a strong alternative date of 258 or 255 BC.

After the end of the war, Athens lost her last pre-Hellenistic vestiges of political independence.

References
 

260s BC conflicts
Wars involving Hellenistic Athens
Wars involving Sparta
Wars involving ancient Greece
Wars involving Antigonid Macedon
Wars involving the Ptolemaic Kingdom